Knud Heglund  (10 July 1894 – 1 September 1960) was a Danish stage and film actor.

Filmography
Tretten år (1932)
De blaa drenge (1933)
 Flight from the Millions (1934)
Under byens tage (1938)
En pige med pep (1940)
Niels Pind og hans dreng (1941)
Tror du jeg er født i går? (1941)
Frøken Kirkemus (1941)
Tag til Rønneby kro (1941)
Tak fordi du kom, Nick (1941)
Frøken Vildkat (1942)
Tordenskjold går i land (1942)
Ballade i Nyhavn (1942)
Hans onsdagsveninde (1943)
Det ender med bryllup (1943)
Teatertosset (1944)
Frihed, lighed og Louise (1944)
Bedstemor går amok (1944)
Det kære København (1944)
Mens sagføreren sover (1945)
De pokkers unger (1947)
Kristinus Bergman (1948)
Tre år efter (1948)
Min kone er uskyldig (1950)
Susanne (1950)
Mød mig på Cassiopeia (1951)
Familien Schmidt (1951)
The Old Mill on Mols (1953)
Tre piger fra Jylland (1957)

External links

Danish male stage actors
Danish male film actors
20th-century Danish male actors
Male actors from Copenhagen
1894 births
1960 deaths